is a Japanese anime television series produced by Bones, directed by Takuya Igarashi and written by Yōji Enokido. It was broadcast for twenty-five episodes in Japan on MBS from April to September 2014. The series follows high-school student Daichi Manatsu who starts working for the Globe organization to pilot a giant robot called the Earth Engine Impacter to protect the Earth from the invading alien force known as the "Kill-T-Gang", that intends to drain all the life force of mankind to empower their immortal existences.

Plot
In order to aid Daichi, Globe starts gathering allies including Teppei Arashi, a Kill-T-Gang whose memories have been erased and trapped inside a human's body; Hana Mutou, a mysterious girl connected to the ship Blume; and Akari Yomatsuri, a 17-year-old genius hacker. Together they form the Midsummer's Knights and fight the Kill-T-Gangs who are in search of more of their allies.

Characters

Globe

Midsummer's Knights

Daichi is a 17-year-old high school student who lost his father years prior in a space travel accident and left his family's home on Tanegashima afterwards. When he sees a ringed rainbow formation on a television broadcast from the Tanegashima Space Center, he returns. Because of his skill at a particular arcade game, it makes him the perfect pilot for the Earth Engine Impacter and the smaller Earth Engine Ordinary component robot. Daichi is able to summon a mysterious laser handgun known as the Livlaster Tanegashima, a powerful weapon that utilizes pure Orgone energy, which is essential for piloting the Earth Engine. Later he is assigned the title of "Captain Earth", the leader of the Midsummer's Knights. Daichi is uncomfortable with his new title and the responsibilities that come from being a "Captain" like his father. The Planetary Gears refer to Daichi as a "Neoteny." Daichi wears a white and red flight suit on missions, matching the Earth Engine's paint job. He is the first human to use a Livlaster.

Teppei is one of Daichi's childhood friends. Daichi is in fact his only friend, as the boy was the only person to not fear his otherworldly abilities, such as being able to create a rainbow ring in his hand. Teppei rarely smiles at anyone and seemed happy when Daichi wasn't afraid of his weird powers. He is, in truth, the human form of the Type-3 Kill-T-Gang known as Albion and is called "Alaya" by other Kill-T-Gang members. The genes for his "Designer's Child" human body were provided by a man named Eiji Arashi, who was in stasis on the Tenkaido station before escaping. Teppei's Ego Block is eventually destroyed, leaving him a normal human. Though he loses the ability to become Albion, he gains his own Livlaster, which he uses to power up his own mecha, the prototype Nebula Engine Impacter. His Machine Goodfellow unit, the silver-colored Aramusha, is converted into the Nebula Engine Ordinary component robot. Like Daichi, Teppei is now referred to as a "Neoteny" by the Planetary Gears. Teppei wears a blue flight suit when on missions, matching the paint scheme on the Nebula Engine.

Hana is a strange girl who appears to be 17 years old as her true age is unknown. She was discovered in the basement of the Tanegashima Space Center enclosed in a sphere. Hana was found with a Livlaster weapon of her own, but she is unable to summon or use it and it is kept in storage at Globe HQ. She is connected to a ship known as Blume, hidden somewhere on Tanegashima Island, and possesses the ability to instill Orgone energy from Blume into a Machine Goodfellow unit by singing a certain song. She is also often accompanied by a strange squirrel-like creature named Pitz that can communicate with her and predict Orgone energy events. She is in love with Daichi. Hana was created by the Planetary Gears as a living weapon capable of using a Livlaster, but she escaped to Earth to hide in stasis until Daichi found her years later. Hana wears a pink flight suit when on missions and later becomes the pilot of Globe's third mecha, the Flare Engine Impacter.

Pitz is Hana's blue squirrel-like creature that can communicate with her and predict Orgone energy events. Also theorized to be the mysterious blue hair girl showing out from time to time.

Akari is a 17-year-old genius hacker who styles herself as a magical girl of sorts. She is Nishikubo and Yomatsuri's daughter, and claims she dedicated herself to hacking while her parents were not with her due to work. She has allegedly hacked into international satellites even from the US. She operates under the handle "Code Papillon" when hacking. Akari is so skilled at computers, she has the ability to access and control every weapon of mass destruction on the planet, but she claims she can only attempt this once, as the world's governments would recognize and counter future attempts. Akari wears a yellow flight suit on missions.

Tanegashima Base

Nishikubo is the head of the Globe organization's Tanegashima Base. He previously worked with Daichi's father Taiyou Manatsu. He's Akari's father whom she rarely sees due to work. Nishikubo has a habit of going over the heads of his superiors if it means completing a mission successfully.

Rita is the deputy head of the Globe organization's Tanegashima Base.

The technology development manager of the Globe organisation, he was a former employee of Macbeth Enterprises.

One of the operators at the Tanegashima Base. He has black skin.

One of the operators at the Tanegashima Base. He has blond hair.

Tenkaido
Tenkaido is Globe's space station, where Kill-T-Gang attacks are monitored. The station also houses several thousand people in stasis as part of an evacuation plan should the Impacters ever fail.

The head of the Tenkaido, she is Akari's mother and Tsutomu's ex-wife.

One of the operators of the Tenkaido. She has blonde hair.

One of the operators of the Tenkaido. She has brown hair.

Planetary Gears
The Planetary Gears are a group of alien beings, known as Kill-T-Gang, who feed on orgone energy originating from human libido. Their essences are contained in Ego Blocks, which are digitized forms of consciousness, stored on a ship stranded in the orbit of Uranus. Nine years before the start of the series, the Planetary Gears wiped out a research team stationed on the dark side of the moon, draining their libido and creating a giant, glowing crystal that covers most of the moon's surface. Kill-T-Gang are able to inhabit genetically engineered, artificial bodies known as Designer's Children, and can inhabit and pilot their true forms, giant mecha-like energy beings, through cockpit-like devices known as "Machine Goodfellow," which can also be converted into small mecha for Earth-based combat. Kill-T-Gang have access to special abilities known as "singularities" that differ on the individual but have the common trait of both sharing memories and communicating telepathically through kissing. Because the Kill-T-Gang's true forms absorb libido through proximity, humanity would be wiped out should even one make it to the Earth, necessitating the use of Impacters.

The humanoid form of the Type-1 Kill-T-Gang robot . He is the leader of the invasion force he calls the "Planetary Gears," and sees the eternal lives of the Kill-T-Gang as their strength. To Amara, humanity is nothing more than a pure energy source to extend the Kill-T-Gang's powers. Nine years before the series, he faced Taiyou Manatsu and caused his death and was also responsible for the large crystal on the moon's surface. After his and Moco's attacks are thwarted by Daichi and Teppei, Amara uses Puck to search for his dormant comrades and reawaken them to their true selves. Amara has a singularity ability that allows him to awaken a Kill-T-Gang with a kiss. Amara's blue Machine Goodfellow unit is known as Tenrousei (literally "Celestial Wolf Star").

The humanoid form of the Type-2 Kill-T-Gang robot . She is the first Kill-T-Gang encountered by Daichi and co-leads the Planetary Gears along Amara. After her and Amara's attacks are thwarted by Daichi and Teppei, she along Amara search for their dormant comrades and awake them to their true selves. Moco is a skilled hacker, but not on the level of Akari, and her singularity ability allows her to transfer memories and knowledge through kissing. Moco's pink Machine Goodfellow unit is known as Moukou Usagi (literally "Assault Rabbit").

The humanoid form of the Type-8 Kill-T-Gang robot . It takes the form of a childish looking girl wearing a large hat. Setuna is accompanied by a pink squirrel-like being of the same species as Pitz named Lappa and has the power to siphon Orgone Energy from nearby beings by singing. She is the true leader of the Planetary Gears.

The humanoid form of the Type-6 Kill-T-Gang robot . He takes the form of a dignified young man in a long cloak. He was a quiet but talented individual, and was a dealer at a casino, having his talents exploited by others he felt, he had nothing of his own before being reawakened. His singularity ability gives him the power to disrupt and disable any electronics in a wide radius. Zin's red Machine Goodfellow unit is named Jingaikyou and its mecha configuration is equipped with a large fan for flight.

The humanoid form of the Type-5 Kill-T-Gang robot . It takes the form of a young woman in a long flowing dress. Ai was a popular teen idol, who became insecure of her career, before her reawakening. Ai's yellow Machine Goodfellow unit is known as Hebihanabi (literally "Fire Flower") and is a heavy artillery unit equipped with large shoulder cannons.

The humanoid form of the Type-4 Kill-T-Gang robot . It takes the form of a young woman in a dress that shows off her legs. She was a fiercely competitive and unmatched biker, who was obsessed with speed, a trait that carries even after her reawakening. Lin's turquoise Machine Goodfellow unit, Ningyohime (literally "Mermaid Princess"), is a speedy watercraft equipped with combat knives.

The humanoid form of the Type-7 Kill-T-Gang robot . It takes the form of a young man who appears to be trained in martial arts. He was first confined and later sold to the Asanoda Yakuza after Kumiko, the daughter heir chose him, and serves as an illegal wrestler for the family to earn large funds through bets earning a name for himself. During a match against Amara, he has vague memories of his previous encounters with him, causing him confusion and escapes before Moco could awaken him. Eventually it is revealed that every member of the Asanoda family was killed on a bombing incident, causing him to revive all the victims with his Singularity. However, since they are not fully revived, his power fades and all people die again, including Kumiko, and joins the Planetary Gears out of grief. Baku's green Machine Goodfellow unit, Bakuretsujyu, is a close-combat unit equipped with brass knuckle weapons and stretchable arms and legs.

Macbeth Enterprises
Macbeth Enterprises is a greatly successful conglomerate, and one of the major stakeholders of the Planetary Gears, designing the Machine Goodfellows and the Designer Child program, and assist the aliens in different ways. After the Kanda Incident, a major scandal that involved several government agencies discovering the illegal genetic modification of children, and the apparent suicide of its former CEO, the company is under the management of Masaki Kube, a member of the company's founding family.

The current CEO of Macbeth Enterprises. He plans to exploit the use of Orgone Energy, Designer Children, the Kiltgangs and the Kivotos Plan to his own ends in order to rule over humanity and holds his secretary Hitomi in high regard and as a possible love interest. Despite his knowledge of the Kiltgangs, he seems to be completely oblivious that Amara and Moco are in fact the aliens themselves and believes them to be submissive Designer Children that he holds in high esteem. After discovering that Puck has not been completely loyal to him, he confronts the computer and threatens to shut it down, but its emergency interrupter is ineffective and Kube is subsequently knocked unconscious through gas, and has his body snatched by Puck through a machine that transferred its consciousness.

Kube's personal secretary. She is the closest to Kube and he shares many of his secrets solely to her, as he holds her in high regard. She does her best to ensure the company and its employees are working to the best, and is very strict. Hitomi has feelings for Kube which are seemingly reciprocated.

A mysterious computer hidden in a special room within Macbeth Enterprises main office, with a highly advanced AI that allows him to engage in normal conversations, usually commenting on Kube's love affair. He is also known as P.A.C. Although apparently submissive towards Kube, he is secretly aligned with the Planetary Gears, taking orders from Amara and Moco and assisting them the best he can. He eventually lays a trap for Kube, using gas to make him lose consciousness and use a special consciousness-transferring machine that previously belonged to Mao Marimura in order to take possession of Kube's body. He tends to use the catchphrase "Puck does not lie".

Other characters

Daichi's father, who died in a suicidal attack nine years before the events of the series during the Kill-T-Gang's first attempt to invade the Earth. Daichi was told that he had died in an accident. Taiyou was a "Captain," a title that his son eventually inherits.

Brother of Taiyou Manatsu, Daichi's uncle and legal guardian.

Release
The anime series is directed by Takuya Igarashi and produced by Bones. Igarashi made sure the title did not sound like a made-up word when revealing it. Through it, he wants the viewers to imagine what it would be like and create a different impression when watching the show. Unlike his previous work, Star Driver, Captain Earth focused less on high schools and more on the relationship between human characters who pilot mechas. Something the team was aiming for with Captain Earth is having a good looking launch sequence as he believes "robots and rockets are deeply imbued with childhood dreams and that sort of giddy excitement in boys’ hearts."

The series is being simulcasted by Crunchyroll in their website. It premiered in Japan on April 5, 2014, on MBS, and at later dates on Tokyo MX, TVA, BS11 and MBC. It was broadcast for twenty-five episodes. Kayano also performed the song  as her character Hana Mutou, which was included in the first episode. From episode fourteen onwards, the opening theme is "TOKYO Dreamer" by Nico Touches the Walls and the ending theme is "The Glory Days" by Tia.

Satoshi Ishino is adapting Fumi Minato's original character designs for animation, and he is also the chief animation director. A Star Driver veteran, Shigeto Koyama, designed the Earth Engine and other Engine Series mecha, while Takayuki Yanase handled the Machine Goodfellow designs and other mecha. Shinji Aramaki and Takeshi Takakura are the other mechanical designers. Masaki Asai and Takeshi Yoshioka designed the enemy Kill-T-Gang, and the artist okama is contributing concept designs. Tsuyoshi Kusano is the graphic designer, and Masatsugu Saitō is credited for design works.

The series was released onto DVD and Blu-ray format with the first volume published on July 18, 2014. The anime has been licensed by Sentai Filmworks for digital and home video release.

Episode list

Home video

Manga
A manga adaptation illustrated by Hiroshi Nakanishi was serialized in Shogakukan's Weekly Shōnen Sunday magazine from April 19 to October 8, 2014, and later on Club Sunday web platform, from October 24, 2014, to April 17, 2015. Shogakukan collected is chapters in four tankōbon volumes, released from August 18, 2014 to May 18, 2015.

Volume list

Video game
A visual novel titled Captain Earth: Mind Labyrinth was released on February 26, 2015, for the PlayStation Vita.

Reception
Andy Hanley from UK Anime Network called it "Eureka Seven meets Star Driver", and noted that this might grab the attention of fans of the prior works. Critical reception to the first episode has been mixed within the Anime News Network staff, with several comments focused on the pacing but mostly praise given to the animation.

References

External links
 

2015 video games
Anime with original screenplays
Bones (studio)
Mainichi Broadcasting System original programming
Sentai Filmworks
Shogakukan manga
Shōnen manga
Super robot anime and manga
Tokyo MX original programming
PlayStation Vita games
PlayStation Vita-only games
Japan-exclusive video games
Video games developed in Japan